Niobium(V) ethoxide is an metalorganic compound with formula Nb2(OC2H5)10. It is a colorless liquid that dissolves in some organic solvents but hydrolyzes readily. It is mainly used for the sol-gel processing of materials containing niobium oxides.

Structure
Metal alkoxides rarely adopt monomeric structures, and niobium(V) ethoxide is no exception.  Early studies established that niobium alkoxides aggregate in solution as dimers.  Subsequent crystallographic analysis established that the methoxide and isopropoxides of niobium adopt bioctahedral structures.  From a geometric perspective, the ten ethoxide ligand oxygen atoms of the Nb2(OEt)10 molecule in solution define a pair of octahedra sharing a common edge with the two niobium atoms located at their centres.  From a bonding perspective, each niobium centre is surrounded octahedrally by four monodentate and two bridging ethoxide ligands.  The oxygen atoms of the bridging ethoxides are each bonded to both niobium centres, and these two ligands are cis to one another within the coordination sphere.  The formula [(EtO)4Nb(μ-OEt)]2 more comprehensively represents this dimeric structure, though the simplified formula is commonly used for most purposes.

Preparation and reactions
This compound is prepared by salt metathesis from niobium pentachloride (Et = C2H5):
10 NaOEt  +  Nb2Cl10   →   Nb2(OC2H5)10  +  10 NaCl

The most important reaction of niobium alkoxides is their hydrolysis to produce films and gels of niobium oxides.  Although these reactions are complex, they can be described by this simplified equation:
Nb2(OC2H5)10  +   5 H2O   →   Nb2O5  +  10 HOEt

The thermal decomposition of Nb(OC2H5)5 begins above 325 – 350 °C. This can be observed with QMS as an increasing amount of ethanol and ethane released. Diethyl ether, C2H5OC2H5, and niobium(V) oxide are the decomposition products released following an atomic layer deposition or chemical vapor deposition process. The decomposition reaction can be summarised as:

Nb2(OC2H5)10   → Nb2O5 + 5 O(C2H5)2

References

Ethoxides
Niobium(V) compounds